Cymindis uniseriata is a species of ground beetle in the subfamily Harpalinae. It was described by Henry Walter Bates in 1884.

References

uniseriata
Beetles described in 1884